Tony Pro (born September 1973) is an American realist painter known for his paintings of the human figure, still life, and landscapes. He studied art in Westlake Village at the California Art Institute under the illustrator Glen Orbik. In 2005, Pro was awarded the American National Award of Excellence 'Best of Show' at the 14th Annual Oil Painters of America National Show for his painting "Mother's Love". Pro's work hangs in museums, government facilities and private collections around the world.

His painting, "Kenny", of 5-time Grammy Award nominee Kenny Wayne Shepherd adorns the cover of Shepherd's 2014 album, Goin' Home.

In 2016, Pro was featured on Gordon Ramsay's Hell's Kitchen with his portrait of Gordon created for the show.

Awards
2014 – 1st place, Portrait Society of America International Competition
2005 – Best of Show, Oil Painters of America National Show

References

Painters from California
1973 births
Living people
20th-century American painters
American male painters
21st-century American painters
21st-century American male artists
People from Northridge, Los Angeles
20th-century American male artists